Košarkaški klub Kaštela (for sponsorship reasons also known as Ribola Kaštela) is a professional basketball club based in Kaštela, Croatia. It competes in the Prva liga.

Notable players
 Dragan Bender
 Ante Žižić

Notable coaches
 Stipe Bralić
 Damir Rančić

External links
Official Website

Basketball teams in Croatia
Basketball teams established in 2001
2001 establishments in Croatia